Hansard is the traditional name for the printed transcripts of parliamentary debates in the Westminster system of government. 

Hansard may also refer to:

People
Bart Hansard, American actor in Tyler Perry's House of Payne and other shows
Glen Hansard (born 1970), Irish singer/guitarist with The Frames
Luke Hansard (1752–1828), English printer and namesake of the Hansard transcripts
Thomas Curson Hansard (1776–1833), an English printer and son of Luke Hansard

Other uses
Hansard (railway point), a railway point in British Columbia, Canada
Hansard Global, a British financial services firm
Hansard TV, a legislature broadcaster for British Columbia, Canada
Hansard (play), a 2019 play by Simon Woods

See also
Hansard Society, a British society for the promotion of parliamentary democracy